Guillermo Smitarello Pedernera (born 7 January 1993) is a Spanish footballer who plays for Utenis Utena. Mainly a defensive midfielder he can also play as a central defender.

Club career
Born in Torrevieja, Alicante, Valencia, Pibe graduated from Hércules CF's youth system, and made his senior debuts with the reserves in 2011, in the regional leagues. On 14 October 2012 he played his first match as a professional, playing the entire second half in a 2–1 away win against CE Sabadell FC in the Segunda División championship.

In January 2013 Pibe joined Recreativo de Huelva, being assigned to the B-side in Tercera División. He appeared regularly for the Andalusians, and moved to another reserve team in July, Real Murcia Imperial also in the fourth division.

On 30 August 2014 Pibe made his debut with the main squad, starting in a 2–1 Segunda División B away win against Racing de Ferrol.

References

External links

1993 births
Living people
People from Vega Baja del Segura
Sportspeople from the Province of Alicante
Spanish footballers
Footballers from the Valencian Community
Association football midfielders
Segunda División players
Segunda División B players
Tercera División players
Hércules CF B players
Hércules CF players
Atlético Onubense players
Real Murcia players
AD Alcorcón B players
CD Eldense footballers